Not So Stupid (French: Pas si bête) is a 1946 French comedy film directed by André Berthomieu and starring Bourvil, Suzy Carrier and Bernard Lancret. In 1928 Berthomieu had made a silent film of the same name.  This was Bourvil's first film; originally a musician and singer, he went on to become one of the great comic actors of French cinema.

The film's art direction was by Raymond Nègre. It was shot at the Cité Elgé studios in Paris.

Plot summary

"Pas si bête" is a comedy about social differences and appearances. Léon Ménard (Bourvil), a farmer and an apparently simple man of the country, is invited to visit his uncle Henri Ménard (Albert Duvaleix), a prosperous industrialist.  He encounters a number of people scheming to marry into the Ménard family for the sake of money.  Ménard discovers and thwart the plots and manages to unite a young couple who truly are in love.  The romantic comedy ends happily with a double marriage.  Henri's daughter Nicole (Suzy Carrier) marries Didier (Bernard Lancret), and Ménard marries his new-found love Rosine (Jacqueline Beyrot).   It turns out that Léon is "not so stupid" after all.

Cast
 Bourvil as Lèon Ménard  
 Suzy Carrier as Nicole  
 Bernard Lancret as Didier  
 Yvette Andréyor as Mademoiselle  
 Mona Goya as Gaby  
 Albert Duvaleix as Henri
 Charles Bouillaud as Joseph  
 Gaston Mauger as Le père de léon  
 Paul Faivre as Le notaire  
 Made Siamé as La mère ménard  
 Jacqueline Beyrot as Rosine  
 Frédéric Munié 
 Léon Daubrel 
 Jean Gabert 
 Yves Deniaud as Antony  
 Jacques Louvigny as De bellemont

References

Bibliography 
 Janis L. Pallister & Ruth A. Hottell. Francophone Women Film Directors: A Guide. Fairleigh Dickinson Univ Press, 2005.

External links 
 

1946 films
1946 comedy films
French comedy films
1940s French-language films
Films directed by André Berthomieu
Remakes of French films
Sound film remakes of silent films
French black-and-white films
1940s French films